Alexander Mitchell, (13 April 1780 – 25 June 1868) was an Irish engineer who from 1802 was blind. He is known as the inventor of the screw-pile lighthouse.

Born in Dublin, his family moved to Belfast while he was a child, and he received his formal education at Belfast Academy – where he excelled in mathematics.

Originally working in brickmaking in Belfast, he invented machines used in that trade, before patenting the screw-pile in 1833, for which he would later gain some fame. The screw-pile was used for the erection of lighthouses and other structures on mudbanks and shifting sands, including bridges and piers. Mitchell's designs and methods were employed all over the world from Portland breakwater to Bombay bridges. Initially it was used for the construction of lighthouses on Maplin Sands in the Thames Estuary (the first light application, in 1838), at Fleetwood Lancashire (UK) Morecambe Bay (the first Ever Beacon Lit ) completed, in 1839), and at Belfast Lough where his lighthouse was finished in July 1844.

In 1848 he was elected member of the Institution of Civil Engineers and received the Telford Medal the following year for a paper on his invention.

In May 1851 he moved to Cobh to lay the foundation for a lighthouse on the Spit Bank; the success of these undertakings led to the use of his invention on the breakwater at Portland, the viaduct and bridges on the Bombay, Baroda and Central India Railway and a broad system of Indian telegraphs.

He became friendly with astronomer John Thomas Romney Robinson, and mathematician George Boole.

He died at Glen Devis near Belfast on 25 June 1868. His wife and daughter had predeceased him.

References

1780 births
1868 deaths
People from County Dublin
Irish engineers
Irish inventors
Lighthouse builders
People educated at the Belfast Royal Academy
Irish blind people
Scientists with disabilities